Quinisocaine (INN) or dimethisoquin (BAN and USAN) is a topical anesthetic used as an antipruritic.

Synthesis

The Henry reaction between phthalaldehydic acid (2-Formylbenzoic acid) [119-67-5] (1) and 1-nitropentane [628-05-7] occurs by a mechanism that involves a hydroxy acid (2). Expulsion of water then gives (3). Reduction of the nitro group via catalytic hydrogenation leads to the amine, CID:158569430 (4). Treatment of that amine with sodium hydroxide leads to ring opening of the lactone ring to the intermediary amino acid (5). This cyclises spontaneously to the lactam so that the product isolated from the reaction mixture is in fact the isoquinoline derivative, CID:154188092 (7). Dehydration by means of strong acid gives 3-Butylisocarbostyril [132-90-1] (8). Phosphorus oxychloride converts the oxygen function to the corresponding chloride via the enol forms 3-butyl-1-chloroisoquinoline [87-06-9] (9). Displacement of halogen with the sodium salt from 2-dimethylaminoethanol (10) affords dimethisoquin (11).

References

Local anesthetics
Isoquinolines
Phenol ethers
Dimethylamino compounds